Izhar Cohen (born March 13, 1951) is an Israeli singer who won the 1978 Eurovision Song Contest.

Biography
Izhar Cohen was born in Tel Aviv, Israel, and raised in Givatayim, to a family of singers of Yemenite-Jewish descent – Shlomo Cohen, Sarah Cohen, and Hofni, Pini, and Vardina Cohen.

Singing and stage career
Cohen started to sing when he was a child and joined his father in his performances. At 18, Cohen joined the IDF's Nachal entertainment troupe. During the 1970s Cohen was one of the most played singers in Israel. Representing Israel, he won the 1978 Eurovision Song Contest with the group Alphabeta performing "A-Ba-Ni-Bi" with music by Nurit Hirsh and words by Ehud Manor. The title of the song is the Hebrew word "ani" (first person singular pronoun) expressed in the popular children's language game "Bet language".

Cohen later represented Israel again (this time with an unnamed group of backing singers) at the 1985 contest performing "Olé, Olé" (music – Kobi Oshrat, words – Hamutal Ben-Ze'ev) where he finished 5th. He attempted to represent Israel again in 1982, 1987 and 1996 but did not win the national final.

Cohen was an actor in the Haifa Theater. He owns a jewelry shop on Dizengoff Street in Tel Aviv.

Izhar was on The Singer in the Mask as "Bull", getting 10th overall.

See also
Music of Israel

References

External links
https://web.archive.org/web/20170212014526/http://www.izhar-cohen.eu.pn/
A-ba-ni-bi lyric with English translation
Ole ole lyric with English translation

VIDEO: Eurovision 1978 - Israel - Izhar Cohen & Alpha Beta - A-ba-ni-bi - א-ב-ני-בי 
Facebook page

1951 births
Living people
20th-century Israeli male singers
Israeli male stage actors
Israeli people of Yemeni-Jewish descent
Eurovision Song Contest winners
Eurovision Song Contest entrants for Israel
Eurovision Song Contest entrants of 1978
Eurovision Song Contest entrants of 1985
Jewish Israeli musicians
Musicians from Tel Aviv
People from Givatayim
Jewellers